This is a list of state prisons in New York.

The  New York State Department of Corrections and Community Supervision is the department of the New York State government that maintains the state prisons and parole system. There are 44 prisons funded by the State of New York, and approximately 28,200 parolees at seven regional offices as of 2022. 

As of 2016 New York does not contract with private prisons, according to state law.

Facilities 

The following list does not include federal prisons, New York City jails, or county jails located in the state of New York.

 Adirondack Correctional Facility
 Albion Correctional Facility
 Altona Correctional Facility
 Attica Correctional Facility
 Auburn Correctional Facility
 Bare Hill Correctional Facility
 Bedford Hills Correctional Facility
 Cape Vincent Correctional Facility (capacity 882)
 Cayuga Correctional Facility
 Clinton Correctional Facility
 Collins Correctional Facility
 Coxsackie Correctional Facility
 Eastern Correctional Facility
 Edgecombe Correctional Facility (capacity <200)
 Elmira Correctional Facility
 Fishkill Correctional Facility
 Five Points Correctional Facility
 Franklin Correctional Facility
 Gouverneur Correctional Facility
 Great Meadow Correctional Facility
 Green Haven Correctional Facility
 Greene Correctional Facility
 Groveland Correctional Facility
 Hale Creek Correctional Facility (capacity 480)
 Hudson Correctional Facility (capacity 402)
 Lakeview Shock Incarceration Correctional Facility
 Marcy Correctional Facility
 Mid-State Correctional Facility
 Mohawk Correctional Facility
 Orleans Correctional Facility
 Otisville Correctional Facility
 Queensboro Correctional Facility (capacity 416)
 Riverview Correctional Facility
 Shawangunk Correctional Facility
 Sing Sing Correctional Facility
 Sullivan Correctional Facility
 Taconic Correctional Facility
 Ulster Correctional Facility (capacity 882)
 Upstate Correctional Facility
 Wallkill Correctional Facility
 Washington Correctional Facility
 Wende Correctional Facility
 Woodbourne Correctional Facility 
 Wyoming Correctional Facility

Closed 
 Arthur Kill Correctional Facility (closed 2011). Converted into TV set.
 Bayview Correctional Facility (closed 2012)
 Beacon Correctional Facility (closed 2013)
 Buffalo Correctional Facility (closed 2011)
 Butler ASACTC
 Butler Correctional Facility (closed July 26, 2014)
 Camp Gabriels (closed July 1, 2009)
 Camp Georgetown (closed 2011)
 Camp Pharsalia (closed 2010)
 Chateaugay Correctional Facility (closed July 26, 2014)
 Clinton Correctional Facility Annex (closed March 31, 2021)
 Downstate Correctional Facility (closed March 10, 2022)
 Fulton Correctional Facility (closed 2011)
 Gowanda Correctional Facility (closed March 31, 2021)
 Lincoln Correctional Facility (closed September 1, 2019)
 Livingston Correctional Facility (closed September 1, 2019)
 Lyon Mountain Correctional Facility (closed 2011)
 Mid-Orange Correctional Facility (closed 2011)
 Monterey Shock Incarceration Correctional Facility (closed July 26, 2014)
 Moriah Shock Incarceration Correctional Facility (closed March 10, 2022)
 Mt. McGregor Correctional Facility (closed July 26, 2014)
 Ogdensburg Correctional Facility (closed March 10, 2022)
 Oneida Correctional Facility (closed October 1, 2011)
 Parkside Correctional Facility (closed 1999)
 Rochester Correctional Facility (capacity <200) (closed March 10, 2022)
 Southport Correctional Facility (closed March 10, 2022)
 Summit Shock Incarceration Correctional Facility (closed 2011)
 Watertown Correctional Facility (closed March 31, 2021)
 Willard Drug Treatment Center (closed March 10, 2022)

References 

 
New York
Prisons